The Women's team sprint cross-country skiing competition at the 2006 Winter Olympics in Turin, Italy was held on 14 February, at Pragelato. This was the first time the team sprint was contested in the Winter Olympics. Each race featured teams of two, with each skier completing 3 laps of a 1145 metre course.

This event had been held once previously at the World Championships, but then as a free technique event, which Hilde G. Pedersen and Marit Bjørgen won for Norway.  The last classical style team sprint in the World Cup was held in Canmore on 18 December 2005 and won by Germany, with Manuela Henkel and Viola Bauer.

Results

Semifinals
Eight teams were entered in the two semifinals, with the top five in each advancing to the final.

Semifinal 1

Semifinal 2

Final

The top three teams clearly separated themselves, with Sweden pulling away in the final metres to finish ahead of Canada and win the gold.

References

Women's cross-country skiing at the 2006 Winter Olympics
Women's team sprint cross-country skiing at the Winter Olympics